Downs is a village in McLean County, Illinois, United States. The population was 1,201 at the 2020 census, up from 1,005 in 2010. It is part of the Bloomington–Normal Metropolitan Statistical Area.

Geography
U.S. Route 150 passes through the northeast side of the village, leading northwest to Bloomington and southeast  to Le Roy. Interstate 74 passes through the southwest side of the village, with access from Exit 142. I-74 leads northwest to Bloomington and southeast  to Champaign.

Kickapoo Creek flows through the northwest side of the village, leading southwest to Salt Creek, a tributary of the Sangamon River, near Lincoln.

History
Downs was originally a small community known as "Delta", established by McLean County settlers in 1829. Previously, the area served as a trading post for the Kickapoo people. When the Indiana, Bloomington and Western Railway was built in 1869, several buildings were dismantled and reconstructed further south to put the town closer to the railroad. The town was then renamed "Priceville" in honor of John Price, a resident who owned the land near the tracks. In 1902, the town's name was changed to "Downs", after postal clerks commonly confused Priceville with the similarly-named Illinois town of Princeville. Downs is named for Lawson Downs, one of the area's pioneer settlers.

Demographics

As of the census of 2000, there were 776 people, 284 households, and 220 families residing in the village. The racial makeup of the village was 97.81% White, 0.90% African American, 0.13% Asian, 0.52% from other races, and 0.64% from two or more races. Hispanic or Latino of any race were 0.90% of the population.
There were 284 households, out of which 43.0% had children under the age of 18 living with them, 65.8% were married couples living together, 9.5% had a female householder with no husband present, and 22.5% were non-families. 17.3% of all households were made up of individuals, and 6.3% had someone living alone who was 65 years of age or older. The average household size was 2.73 and the average family size was 3.13.

In the village, the population was spread out, with 30.3% under the age of 18, 7.5% from 18 to 24, 35.4% from 25 to 44, 19.3% from 45 to 64, and 7.5% who were 65 years of age or older. The median age was 33 years.

The median income for a household in the village was $53,750, and the median income for a family was $56,932. Males had a median income of $37,188 versus $27,308 for females. The per capita income for the village was $22,468. About 5.0% of families and 4.3% of the population were below the poverty line, including 4.0% of those under age 18 and none of those age 65 or over

As of 2010 the population was 1005.  The racial and ethnic make-up of the population is 94.6% Non-Hispanic white, 1.7% African American, 0.2% Native American, 0.7% Asian, 2.2% two or more races and 0.9% Hispanic or Latino.

School
Most children in Downs attend the Tri-Valley schools which are part of District #3, offices located on Washington Street. The Tri-Valley schools are small, and the elementary, middle and high school are all located next to one another. All three schools have been recognized as National Blue Ribbon Schools by the U.S. Department of Education. At one time all classes were held in one building, which now is rundown. The football team won 2A state final in 2015.

References

External links

Villages in McLean County, Illinois
Villages in Illinois
Populated places established in 1870
1870 establishments in Illinois